Armenouhi Martirosyan (born May 3, 1961 in Yerevan), is an Armenian artist.

Biography
Armenouhi Martirosyan was born in Yerevan in the family of priest Ruben Martirosyan. 1979–1981 she studied at theatre studio of Hayfilm. She started to paint at the age of 38. Armenouhi is a specialist of color therapy, she also teaches abstract painting to people of different ages and professional groups։

Individual exhibitions
 Aram Khachatryan Hall, 2001
 Toronto, Canada, 2006
 "Naregatsi Art center", Yerevan, 2006
 Solo Exhibition, Yerevan, 2009
 Solo Exhibition in National Art Academy Gallery, Yerevan, Armenia, 2011

Group exhibitions
 August Yerevan – group exhibition in Contemporary Art Centre, 2010.
 August group exhibition in NPAC, Yerevan, Armenia., 2011, 2014 
  2nd medal award the Third International Art Competition "Art Without Borders", Kyiv, Ukraine. 
 "World Art in Venice" Exhibition Ca Zanardi Hall, 2012
 "Denial-Օ", Falan Gallery, Yerevan, 2015
2015 From Color to Idea, From Idea to Color, Yerevan Modern Art Museum

Quotes  
Despite the material I act combined with the nature upon my inner feelings. Painting is not a moment interruption but dynamics by means of which I travel infinitely. Beauty is relative; it may be also seen in rubbish. While painting I apply to my mental world which liberates me from all the trammels; free moment instant...

Painting is a lifestyle for me, matter of expression. Whatever I'd like to speak about, I express it by painting. There is question, WHY, I do not know, that is my essence. It is very important to believe in whatever you are doing; otherwise you'll be deviated from your way, to be laconic: hope, faith, love. While painting I’m in my kingdom. It’s where I can instruct everything, where color and line should be in their right place.

Gallery

See also
List of Armenian artists
List of Armenians
Culture of Armenia

References

External links
Armenouhi Martirosyan
Armenouhi Martirosyan, Artworks

1962 births
Armenian painters
Living people
Artists from Yerevan
Armenian women painters